Chileolobus is a monotypic genus of Chilean araneomorph spiders in the family Orsolobidae containing the single species, Chileolobus eden. It was first described by Raymond Robert Forster & Norman I. Platnick in 1985, and is only found in Chile.

See also
 List of Orsolobidae species

References

Monotypic Araneomorphae genera
Orsolobidae
Spiders of South America
Taxa named by Raymond Robert Forster
Endemic fauna of Chile